Magnus is an album by American group Audiomachine, released on 23 June 2015. The album peaked at number two on the Billboard Top Classical Albums chart.

Track listing

Charts

References

External links
 
 

2015 albums
Audiomachine albums